Guaraná ( from the Portuguese guaraná ), Paullinia cupana, syns. P. crysan, P. sorbilis) is a climbing plant in the family Sapindaceae, native to the Amazon basin and especially common in Brazil. Guaraná has large leaves and clusters of flowers, and is best known for the seeds from its fruits, which are about the size of a coffee bean.

As a dietary supplement or herb, guaraná seed is an effective stimulant: it contains about twice the concentration of caffeine found in coffee beans (about 2–8% caffeine in guarana seeds, compared to about 1–3% for coffee beans). The additive has gained notoriety for being used in energy drinks. As with other plants producing caffeine, the high concentration of caffeine is a defensive toxin that repels herbivores from the berry and its seeds.

The colour of the fruit ranges from brown to red and it contains black seeds that are partly covered by white arils. The colour contrast when the fruit is split open has been compared with the appearance of eyeballs and has become the basis of an origin myth among the Sateré-Mawé people.

History and culture
The word guaraná comes from the Guaraní word guara-ná, which has its origins in the Sateré-Maué word for the plant, warana, that in Guaraní means "fruit like the eyes of the people" or "eyes of the gods".

Guaraná plays an important role in Tupi and Guarani culture. According to a myth attributed to the Sateré-Maué tribe, guaraná's domestication originated with a deity killing a beloved village child. To console the villagers, a more benevolent god plucked the left eye from the child and planted it in the forest, resulting in the wild variety of guaraná. The god then plucked the right eye from the child and planted it in the village, giving rise to domesticated guarana.

The Guaranis make a herbal tea by shelling, washing and drying the seeds, followed by pounding them into a fine powder. The powder is kneaded into a dough and then shaped into cylinders. This product is known as guaraná bread, which is grated and then immersed into hot water along with sugar.

This plant was introduced to European colonizers and to Europe in the 16th century by Felip Betendorf, Oviedo, Hernández, Cobo and other Spaniard chroniclers. By 1958, guaraná was commercialized.

Composition

According to the Biological Magnetic Resonance Data Bank, guaranine (better known as caffeine) is found in guaraná and is identical to caffeine derived from other sources, like coffee, tea, and mate. Guaranine, theine, and mateine are all synonyms for caffeine when the definitions of those words include none of the properties and chemicals of their host plants except caffeine. 

Natural sources of caffeine contain widely varying mixtures of xanthine alkaloids other than caffeine, including the cardiac stimulants theophylline, theobromine and other substances such as polyphenols, which can form insoluble complexes with caffeine. The main natural phenols found in guarana are (+)-catechin and (-)-epicatechin.

The table below contains a partial listing of some of the chemicals found in guaraná seeds, although other parts of the plant also may contain them in varying quantities.

Uses

Safety
In the United States, guaraná fruit powder and seed extract have not been evaluated for the status of "generally recognized as safe" (GRAS) by the Food and Drug Administration, but rather are approved as food additives for flavor (but not non-flavor) uses.

Guaraná is used in sweetened or carbonated soft drinks and energy drinks, an ingredient of herbal teas or contained in dietary supplement capsules. South America obtains much of its caffeine from guaraná.

Beverages

Brazil, the third-largest consumer of soft drinks in the world, produces several soft drink brands from the crushed seeds of guaraná, and which they use like coffee. A fermented drink is also prepared from guaraná seeds, cassava and water.  Paraguay is also a producer of guaraná soft drinks with several brands operating in its market. The word guaraná is widely used in Brazil, Peru and Paraguay as a reference to soft drinks containing guaraná extract.

See also 

 Guaraná Antarctica - guarana flavored soft drink from Brazil

References

External links

Guarana at USDA database

 
Paullinia
Herbal and fungal stimulants
Trees of Venezuela
Trees of Brazil
Crops originating from the Americas
Crops originating from Brazil
Tropical agriculture